Ryszard Peryt (9 March 1947 in Zielona Góra – 23 January 2019) was a Polish opera director, conductor, producer and actor. He was also a librettist, having written the libretto for Zygmunt Krause's Balthazar.

References

1947 births
2019 deaths
Polish conductors (music)
Male conductors (music)
People from Zielona Góra
21st-century conductors (music)
Opera librettists
21st-century male musicians